Rosemary Zwick (1925–1995) was an American printmaker and sculptor.

Born in Chicago, Zwick received her BFA at the University of Iowa in 1945; her teachers there included Phillip Guston and Humberto Albrizio.  She took evening classes in printmaking with Max Kahn at the School of the Art Institute of Chicago from 1946 to 1947; from 1947 to 1948 she took education courses at DePaul University, and in 1979 she studied aesthetics at the University of Illinois at Chicago. She exhibited work around the United States, and created a number of ceramic reliefs and other commissions for public spaces in Michigan and Illinois. Her work is in various public and private collections as well. With her mother, Ida K. Pearce, Zwick ran the 4 Arts Gallery in Evanston from 1962 to 1980. She and her husband, Sidney Zwick, had four children, Andrew, Stephen, Somara, and Marissa.

References

1925 births
1995 deaths
20th-century American printmakers
20th-century American sculptors
American women printmakers
American women sculptors
American art dealers
Women art dealers
Artists from Chicago
University of Iowa alumni
School of the Art Institute of Chicago alumni
DePaul University alumni
University of Illinois Chicago alumni
20th-century American women artists
Sculptors from Illinois